James Leland Quinn (September 8, 1875 – November 12, 1960) was an American newspaperman and politician who served two terms as a Democratic member of the U.S. House of Representatives from Pennsylvania from 1935 to 1939.

Life and career
James L. Quinn was born in Emlenton, Pennsylvania. He moved to Braddock, Pennsylvania with his parents in 1880, and attended St. Thomas School.

He was employed as a newspaper reporter from 1891 to 1896, and became owner and publisher of the Braddock Journal in 1896.

Political career
He was a member of the Pennsylvania State House of Representatives from 1933 to 1935.

In 1934, Quinn was elected as a Democrat to the Seventy-fourth Congress and was re-elected to the Seventy-fifth Congress in 1936. He was an unsuccessful candidate for reelection in 1938.

Later career and death
After leaving Congress, he resumed the newspaper publishing business.

He died in Braddock, Pennsylvania, and is interred in Braddock Catholic Cemetery.

Sources

The Political Graveyard

1875 births
1960 deaths
Democratic Party members of the Pennsylvania House of Representatives
American newspaper publishers (people)
Democratic Party members of the United States House of Representatives from Pennsylvania
People from Allegheny County, Pennsylvania
Journalists from Pennsylvania